John Sergeant (1621–1707 or 1710) was an English Roman Catholic priest, controversialist and theologian.

Life

He was a son of William Sergeant, a yeoman in Barrow-upon-Humber, Lincolnshire, and was admitted in 1639 as a sub-sizar at St John's College, Cambridge, graduating in 1643. On the recommendation of William Beale he was appointed secretary to Thomas Morton, the Anglican Bishop of Durham, time he spent on transcriptions of the Church Fathers.  A year or so later, he converted to Catholicism as result of his studies.

He subsequently moved to the English College, Lisbon. He studied theology and in 1650 was ordained as a Catholic priest.  He subsequently taught at the college until 1652, when he became procurator and prefect of studies. From 1653 to 1654, he worked as a priest in England before returning to Lisbon where he resumed his earlier work and taught philosophy. In 1655 he was elected canon and appointed as secretary. For the next twenty years he was actively engaged in controversy, both with Anglicans such as the bishops Edward Stillingfleet and John Tillotson, and Catholics who differed from Thomas White.

At the time of the Oates Plot he entered into communication with the Privy Council which greatly scandalized the Catholics. This arose from his opposition to Jesuit influence in the English Catholic Church.  He avoided arrest by passing as a physician under the names of Dodd, Holland, and Smith. There is an original painting of him at Ushaw College, in Durham.

Works

He was reportedly difficult to work with, saying and writing many things that offended even his co-religionists. He was a voluminous writer, leaving over fifty works, either published or in manuscript.

His three philosophical works, written late in life, were:

1. The Method to Science. London, 1696.

2. Solid Philosophy Asserted, Against the Fancies of the Ideists: or, The Method to Science Farther Illustrated. With Reflexions on Mr. Locke's Essay concerning Human Understanding. London, 1697.

3. Transnatural Philosophy, or Metaphysicks: Demonstrating the Essences and Operations of all Beings whatever, which gives the Principles to all other Sciences. And shewing the perfect Conformity of Christian Faith to Right Reason, and the Unreason ableness of Atheists, Deists, Anti-trinitarians, and
other Sectaries. London, 1700.

References
 Dorothea Crook, John Sergeant And His Circle - A Study Of Three Seventeenth Century English Aristotelians, EJ Brill, 1993. Describes his work and philosophy.
 Journal of the House of Commons: volume 9: 1667-1687 (1802), pp. 710-712. Accessed 23 July 2009.

Notes

1623 births
18th-century deaths
Alumni of St John's College, Cambridge
Converts to Roman Catholicism from Anglicanism
English College, Lisbon alumni
People from Barrow upon Humber
17th-century English Roman Catholic priests
18th-century English Roman Catholic priests
People associated with the Popish Plot